Fruit City is an unincorporated community in Reynolds County, in the U.S. state of Missouri.

History
A post office called Fruit City was established in 1912, and remained in operation until 1922. The community was so named on account of orchards near the original town site.

References

Unincorporated communities in Reynolds County, Missouri
Unincorporated communities in Missouri